The Boston Rockhoppers were an American indoor lacrosse team based in Marlborough, Massachusetts. Formerly a member of the North American Lacrosse League, the Rockhoppers played their home games at New England Sports Center.

On June 18, 2013, the Rockhoppers and the rest of the North American Lacrosse League announced that they would be suspending operations.

History
The franchise was announced as an expansion member of the North American Lacrosse League on January 14, 2012. Originally scheduled to be a 2013 expansion team, due to initial struggles and as a result of the NALL and PLL split, the Rockhoppers moved up their first season to 2012.

On March 2, 2012 the Rockhoppers faced-off against the Kentucky Stickhorses in the first game between two NALL franchises. The Stickhorses won 19-14. The two teams opened the 2013 season, with the Rockhoppers winning 10-9.

After leading the league in goals per game with 16, they played in the championship game against the Kentucky Stickhorses.

2013 Roster

2013 Schedule

✝ Games canceled to Baltimore Bombers mid-season fold.

References

External links
Boston Rockhoppers official Facebook
Boston Rockhoppers official Twitter

North American Lacrosse League teams
Lacrosse teams in Boston
Lacrosse clubs established in 2012
2012 establishments in Massachusetts
Sports clubs disestablished in 2013
2013 disestablishments in Massachusetts
Sports in Marlborough, Massachusetts